Colegio Alemán Alexander von Humboldt may refer to the following German international schools in Spanish-speaking countries:
Colegio Alemán Alexander von Humboldt (Mexico City)
Colegio Humboldt Puebla
German School of Guayaquil (Colegio Alemán Humboldt Guayaquil)